Cynthia Marie "Tina" Girouard (May 26, 1946 – April 21, 2020) was an American video and performance artist best known for her work and involvement in the SoHo art scene of the 1960s and early 1970s.

Early life and education
Cynthia Marie Girouard was born in 1946 at DeQuincy, Louisiana, to Yvelle Marie (Theriot) Girouard, a special education teacher, and Whitney Lewis Girouard, a farmer and teacher of agricultural engineering. She studied art at the University of Southwestern Louisiana, graduating with a BFA in 1968.

Career
When she moved to New York City , Girouard befriended other Louisiana-born artists, including Lynda Benglis, Dickie Landry, and Keith Sonnier.  Their work helped establish New York City's post-minimalist scene. Although not as widely recognized as some of her contemporaries, she was "an early founding participant of 112 Greene St., FOOD, the Clocktower and PS1, Creative Time, Performance Art and the Fabric Workshop" and "in addition to her own projects she was involved in films, videos and performances by Keith Sonnier, Richard Serra, Lawrence Weiner, Laurie Anderson and the Natural History of the American Dancer, among others". Girouard worked as a designer with the New York theater group, Mabou Mines, in the seventies on several productions including The Red Horse Animation and The B. Beaver Animation.   Along with Carol Goodden and Gordon Matta-Clark, Girouard was one of the founders of FOOD, an artist-run restaurant in New York that combined culinary arts with other visual and performance art practices. At FOOD, the acts of cooking and eating were seen as performances. In 1977 Girouard performed with Gerard Murrell as part of the performance program of Documenta 6.

For her contribution to the 1981 exhibition Other Realities: Installations for Performance at the Contemporary Arts Museum Houston, Girouard led a ten-day workshop with local students and then turned material generated during the workshop into the basis for a performance. The remnants of the performance, including costumes, sets, and props, were then exhibited as an installation.  Girouard's work was featured in a solo exhibition curated by Susan Rothenberg at CUE Art Foundation in 2004. More recently it was shown as part of 112 Greene Street: The Early Years (1970-1974) curated by Jessamyn Fiore at David Zwirner Gallery in New York in 2011, and included in the related publication of the same title. Fiore also curated Gordon Matta-Clark, Suzanne Harris, and Tina Girouard: The 112 Greene Street Years Rhona Hoffman Gallery in Chicago in 2013.

In 2013 Girouard participated in the tribute to FOOD organized by Frieze New York.

Girouard's 1977 installation performance piece "Pinwheel", originally executed at the New Orleans Museum of Art was recreated alongside documentation of
the original event at the 2019 edition of Art Basel Miami Beach.

In 2019, Girouard was one of the artists selected for the multi-country retrospective exhibition called Pattern, Crime & Decoration at Le Consortium.

Personal life
Girouard died of a stroke at her home in Cecilia, Louisiana on April 21, 2020.  She was 73.

References

External links
 Group Show  112 Greene Street: The Early Years (1970-1974)
 Food Matters | When Eating and Art Became One
 The Wandering Mind: Death Dances in Haiti by Tina Girouard for Bomb Magazine
Letter from Tina Girouard to Gordon Matta Clark (June 9, 1973), held at the Canadian Centre for Architecture
10 Chatham Square, 2nd floor, in progress, Oct. 69 to June 73, drawing by Tina Girouard, held at the Canadian Centre for Architecture
A curator's tribute to Louisiana-born artist Tina Girouard

1946 births
2020 deaths
20th-century American women artists
People from DeQuincy, Louisiana
Artists from Louisiana
21st-century American women